The following is a list of awards and nominations received by American actress Melissa McCarthy. For her performance in the comedy film Bridesmaids (2011), McCarthy received nominations for the BAFTA Award, Critics' Choice Movie Award, SAG Award, and Academy Award for Best Supporting Actress. Along with the ensemble cast of Bridesmaids, she received nominations for the SAG Award, Critics' Choice Movie Award, and numerous other critics groups. For her performance in the action comedy film Spy (2015), she received a Golden Globe Award nomination. McCarthy received further critical acclaim for her performance in the biographical drama film Can You Ever Forgive Me? (2018), for which she received nominations for the BAFTA Award, Critics' Choice Movie Award, SAG Award, Golden Globe Award, and Academy Award for Best Actress.

Among other accolades, McCarthy also received an MTV Movie Award for Best Comedic Performance, Comedy Award for Best Comedic Actress, and the Santa Barbara International Film Festival's Virtuoso Award and Montecito Award. In 2016, she became the first woman to ever win the Comedic Genius Award at the MTV Movie Awards. She is a recipient of the Primetime Emmy Award for Outstanding Lead Actress in a Comedy Series in 2011 for her performance in the comedy series Mike & Molly and the Primetime Emmy Award for Outstanding Guest Actress in a Comedy Series in 2017 for her performance in the variety series Saturday Night Live. In 2015, she received a motion picture star on the Hollywood Walk of Fame.

In 2020, The New York Times ranked McCarthy as #22 in its list of the 25 Greatest Actors of the 21st Century.

Major associations

Academy Awards

BAFTA Awards

Golden Globe Awards

Primetime Emmy Awards

Screen Actors Guild Awards

Other awards

Golden Raspberry Awards

Kids' Choice Awards

MTV Movie & TV Awards

People's Choice Award

Palm Springs International Film Festival

Satellite Awards

Teen Choice Award

Critics awards

Alliance of Women Film Journalists Award

Boston Society of Film Critics

Critics' Choice Movie Awards

Central Ohio Film Critics Association Award

Chicago Film Critics Association Award

Dallas-Fort Worth Film Critics Association Award

Denver Film Critics Society Award

Detroit Film Critics Society Award

Houston Film Critics Society Award

Indiana Film Journalists Association Award

Iowa Film Critics Award

Las Vegas Film Critics Society Award

New York Film Critics Online Award

Online Film Critics Society Award

Phoenix Film Critics Society Award

San Diego Film Critics Society Award

San Francisco Film Critics Circle Award

Santa Barbara International Film Festival

Toronto Film Critics Association Award

Vancouver Film Critics Circle Award

1: 3-way tie with Olivia Colman for The Favourite and Regina Hall for Support the Girls.

Washington D.C. Area Film Critics Association Award

Women Film Critics Circle Award

Honors and achievements

References

Notes
 A  Shared award with Kristen Wiig, Maya Rudolph, Rose Byrne, Wendi McLendon-Covey and Ellie Kemper.
 B  Shared award with Jason Bateman. 
 C  Shared award with Nargis Fakhri.
 D  Shared award with Sandra Bullock.
 E  Shared award with Sandra Bullock.
 F  Shared award with Kristen Wiig, Kate McKinnon and Leslie Jones.

General

Specific

External links

 Melissa McCarthy at Emmys.com

McCarthy, Melissa
McCarthy family